is a 2015 Japanese drama film directed by Sumio Ōmori (ja), based on the baseball novel by Kiyoshi Shigematsu. It was released on January 17, 2015. This film was shot at Koshien Stadium.

Cast
Kiichi Nakai as Haruhiko Sakamachi
Haru as Mie Tozawa
Emi Wakui as Yūko Tachihara
Toshirō Yanagiba as Naoyuki Takahashi
Mugi Kadowaki as Sanami

Reception
The film earned ¥51,219,300 at the Japanese box office.

References

External links
 

 アゲイン 28年目の甲子園(2014) at allcinema 
 アゲイン 28年目の甲子園 at KINENOTE 

2015 films
2010s sports drama films
Japanese sports drama films
Japanese baseball films
Films based on Japanese novels
2015 drama films
2010s Japanese films
2010s Japanese-language films